Albrecht Christoph Wilhelm von Diez (17 January 1839, Bayreuth – 25 February 1907, Munich) was a German painter and illustrator of the Munich School.

Life 
He attended a trade school in Munich, followed by the Polytechnic School (precursor of the University of Technology) from 1853 to 1855 and, from 1855, the Academy of Fine Arts Munich, where he was briefly a student of Karl von Piloty. He didn't stay at the Academy very long, preferring to teach himself draftsmanship and painting.

He first became known through the illustrations he drew for the Fliegende Blätter, a weekly satirical magazine. In 1871, he illustrated Schiller's History of the Thirty-Years War. He later turned to animal, landscape and genre painting.

Earlier in 1871, with the support of Wilhelm von Kaulbach, Diez became a teacher at the Academy and was soon elevated to Professor. In this position, he not only had a major influence on his pupils (among them, Franz Marc, Fritz Osswald, Alfred Schwarzschild, Max Slevogt, Wilhelm Trübner, Ludwig von Löfftz, Heinrich Lefler, Carl Max Schultheiss and Fritz Mackensen), but also upon the development of the entire Munich School, leading it to a more coloristic approach.

Major works 

All in the National Gallery (Berlin)
 Waldfest, (Forest Festival)
 Totes Reh, (Dead Deer)
 Sankt Georg der Drachentöter, (Study for Saint George, the Dragonslayer)

References

Further reading
 Stefanie Kamm: Wilhelm von Diez. 1839–1907. Ein Künstler zwischen Historismus und Jugendstil. (Reihe Kunstgeschichte; Vol.43). München 1991,

External links 
 Wilhelm von Diez in HeidICON - Illustrations from the "Fliegenden Blättern"

1839 births
1907 deaths
German illustrators
People from Bayreuth
19th-century German painters
19th-century German male artists
German male painters